Maximilian Günther (born 2 July 1997) is a German racing driver currently competing in Formula E for Maserati MSG Racing. Günther has previously driven in Formula 2 with Arden and for Dragon Racing, BMW i Andretti and Nissan e.dams in Formula E. He achieved his first win in Formula E at the 2020 Santiago ePrix.

Career 
Born in Oberstdorf, Günther began his racing career in karting in 2007. He remained in karting until 2010. 
In 2011, Günther competed in open-wheel racing, in Formula BMW Talent Cup.
In 2013, Günther competed in ADAC Formel Masters from ADAC Berlin-Brandenburg e.V., he ended the season second. In 2014, he also finished second.
In 2015, Günther débuted in the European Formula 3 with kfzteile24 Mücke Motorsport.

FIA Formula 2 Championship 
He scored his maiden podium in only his second race and went on to claim his first F2 victory in the Silverstone sprint race. For the final round of the season in Abu Dhabi, he was replaced by Red Bull junior driver Dan Ticktum.

Formula E

Dragon (2018–2019)

2018–19 season 
Günther joined the Dragon Racing team as test and reserve driver, participating in the Marrakesh rookie test in 2018 and pre-season testing for season five. After Jerome d'Ambrosio departed to move to Mahindra Racing, Günther was promoted to a race seat and made his debut in the Ad Diriyah E-Prix in December 2018. He was replaced by Felipe Nasr after the Santiago ePrix. However, Günther returned to the team for the Rome ePrix, and he completed the season with the team. He scored his first points in Formula E with a 5th-place finish at the Paris ePrix. He finished 5th again at the Swiss ePrix, meaning that he finished his rookie season 17th in the Drivers' Championship.

BMW i Andretti Motorsport (2019–2021)

2019–20 season 
For the 2019–20 season, Günther was signed to race for BMW i Andretti Motorsport after Antonio Felix da Costa moved to reigning champion team DS Techeetah. The second race of the season in Diriyah saw Günther take a maiden podium in second place behind teammate Alexander Sims, but was demoted to 11th after passing Lucas di Grassi under safety car conditions. At the next race in Santiago, Günther claimed his maiden Formula E victory after a last lap pass on da Costa. He finished second at the Marrakesh ePrix after starting second on the grid. He won his home race at the Berlin ePrix after starting second. He finished the season with three points finishes, all of which were podium finishes.

2020–21 season 
Günther was retained by BMW for the following season. He won the New York City ePrix, taking advantage of a collision between Jean-Éric Vergne and Nick Cassidy.

Nissan e.dams (2022)

2021–22 season 
Günther moved to Nissan e.dams for the 2021–22 season. His first points for the team at the Mexico City ePrix would prove to be a red herring, as the German struggled to finish close to teammate Sébastien Buemi throughout the races. The second and final top-ten finish of his campaign would come at the London ePrix, during a weekend where a collision with Nick Cassidy earned Günther critical comments from the New Zealander. Günther ended the season 19th in the standings, having scored just six points.

Maserati MSG Racing (2023–)

2022–23 season 
Günther switched to Maserati MSG Racing for the 2022–23 season, partnering Edoardo Mortara in a seat vacated by Nyck de Vries' decision to switch to the AlphaTauri team in F1. His campaign started out disappointingly, as an eleventh place in Mexico City was followed by a crash in qualifying for the first race in Diriyah, after which the car could not be repaired in time for the race.

FIA World Endurance Championship 
In 2022 Günther drove an endurance racing car for the first time, driving the Peugeot 9X8 Le Mans Hypercar during the post-season test at the Bahrain International Circuit.

Personal life 
Günther currently resides in Monaco. He holds dual German and Austrian nationality. 
In addition to his native German, Günther also speaks English, French, and Spanish.

Racing record

Karting career summary

Racing career summary

Complete ADAC Formel Masters results 
(key) (Races in bold indicate pole position) (Races in italics indicate fastest lap)

Complete FIA Formula 3 European Championship results 
(key) (Races in bold indicate pole position) (Races in italics indicate fastest lap)

Complete Macau Grand Prix results

Complete FIA Formula 2 Championship results 
(key) (Races in bold indicate pole position) (Races in italics indicate points for the fastest lap of top ten finishers)

† Driver did not finish the race, but was classified as he completed over 90% of the race distance.

Complete Formula E results 
(key) (Races in bold indicate pole position; races in italics indicate fastest lap)

† Driver did not finish the race, but was classified as he completed over 90% of the race distance.

References

External links 
 
 

1997 births
Living people
German racing drivers
ADAC Formel Masters drivers
German Formula Three Championship drivers
FIA Formula 3 European Championship drivers
FIA Formula 2 Championship drivers
German people of Austrian descent
Formula E drivers
Mücke Motorsport drivers
Prema Powerteam drivers
Arden International drivers
Dragon Racing drivers
BMW M drivers
Andretti Autosport drivers
DAMS drivers
People from Oberstdorf
Sportspeople from Swabia (Bavaria)
Racing drivers from Bavaria
Formula BMW drivers
Nismo drivers
German expatriate sportspeople in Monaco